Tour of Fuzhou is a men's one-day cycle race which takes place in China and was rated by the UCI as 2.1 (rated 2.2 until the 2016 edition) and forms part of the UCI Asia Tour.

Overall winners

References

Cycle races in China
Autumn events in China